The 2016 North Dakota gubernatorial election was held on November 8, 2016, to elect the Governor and Lieutenant Governor of North Dakota, concurrently with the 2016 U.S. presidential election, as well as elections to the United States Senate, elections to the United States House of Representatives and various state and local elections. This would have been the first time North Dakotans selected a Governor under new voter ID requirements, in which a student ID was insufficient identification to vote, but a court ruling in August 2016 struck the down the provision; the election was held under the 2013 rules.

The primaries took place on June 14. This is the first open seat election since 2000. Incumbent Republican Jack Dalrymple announced that he would not run for re-election to a second full term in office. Doug Burgum (R) defeated Marvin Nelson (DNPL) in the general election to become the new Governor of North Dakota.

Background
In December 2010, Republican Governor John Hoeven resigned after being elected to the U.S. Senate. Jack Dalrymple, the Lieutenant Governor, was sworn in as Governor and was elected to a full term in 2012. In August 2015, Dalrymple announced that he would not run for re-election to a second full term in office.

Republican primary
The North Dakota Republican Party endorsed North Dakota Attorney General Wayne Stenehjem at their April 2-3 state convention, however ballot access was actually determined by the June 14th primary election, which former Microsoft executive Doug Burgum won.

Candidates

Endorsed
 Wayne Stenehjem, North Dakota Attorney General
Running mate: Nicole Poolman, State Senator and wife of Jim Poolman

Other candidates
 Doug Burgum, former Senior Vice President of Microsoft and former Chairman & CEO of Great Plains Software
 Running mate: Brent Sanford, Watford City Mayor
 Paul Sorum, architect
 Running mate: Michael Coachman, human resources executive

Withdrawn
 Rick Becker, state representative

Declined
 Tom Campbell, state senator
 Kevin Cramer, U.S. Representative
 Jack Dalrymple, incumbent Governor
 Ed Schafer, former Governor and former United States Secretary of Agriculture
 Kelly Schmidt, North Dakota State Treasurer (running for re-election)
 Drew Wrigley, Lieutenant Governor

Polling

Republican State Convention
To endorse a candidate, delegates to the Republican state convention voted for one candidate in a series of rounds. After the first round, all candidates would remain on the ballot, but after subsequent rounds of voting, the recipient of the lowest number of votes would be removed. The first candidate to receive more than half the cast vote would receive the state party endorsement.

After no candidate received the majority in the first round, a second round of voting was completed, in which enough delegates voted for Attorney General Wayne Stenehjem to give him the endorsement without having to remove a candidate from the ballot or vote again.

Republican primary results

Democratic primary

Candidates

Endorsed
 Marvin Nelson, state representative
 Running mate: Joan Heckaman, state senator

Declined
 Ellen Chaffee, nominee for lieutenant governor in 2012
 Heidi Heitkamp, U.S. Senator and nominee for governor in 2000
 Tim Mathern, State Senator and nominee for governor in 2008
 Tracy Potter, former state senator, nominee for U.S. Senate in 2010 and nominee for Superintendent of Public Instruction in 2012
 George B. Sinner, State Senator and nominee for North Dakota's at-large congressional district in 2014
 Ryan Taylor, USDA Rural Development State Director, former state senator, nominee for governor in 2012 and nominee for Agriculture Commissioner in 2014
 Sarah Vogel, former North Dakota Agriculture Commissioner and candidate for the North Dakota Supreme Court in 1996

Results

Libertarian Party

Candidates

Endorsed
Marty Riske, businessman and former state party chairman
Running mate: Joshua Voytek

Results

General election

Debates
Complete video of debate, October 10, 2016 - C-SPAN

Predictions

Polling

Results

See also
 United States gubernatorial elections, 2016

References

External links
Doug Burgum (R) for Governor
Marvin Nelson (D) for Governor

2016
Governor
North Dakota